Åkeri & Entreprenad is a Swedish language business magazine based in Ljusdal, Sweden. It features articles concerning transportation industry in the country.

History and profile
Åkeri & Entreprenad was established in 2000. The magazine is owned and published by Svenska Media Docu AB. The headquarters is in Ljusdal.

The target audience of the magazine include decision-makers in freight companies, civil engineering contractors, forestry contractors and rental companies. The magazine sold 71,900 copies in 2014 and 74,500 copies in 2015.

References

External links
 Official website

2000 establishments in Sweden
Business magazines published in Sweden
Magazines established in 2000
Swedish-language magazines
Transport magazines